The Central American Technological University (UNITEC) is a private coeducational institution with campuses in the three main cities of Honduras: Tegucigalpa, San Pedro Sula and La Ceiba.

History

UNITEC (Central American Technological University) is a higher education private institution founded in 1987 by a group of Honduras businessmen and professors of Universidad Nacional Autónoma de Honduras (UNAH), including William Chong Wong, who had envisioned the creation of an institute that had its main focus the teaching of the sciences to its students without compromising their knowledge of the humanities.

It has been rated as the most prestigious private university in Honduras (Unimer Research International, amongst other independent firms), and throughout its history has demonstrated important leadership in the country, based on academic excellence, high technology, and promoting entrepreneurship; supported by strong internationalization programs for its students and faculty. This makes UNITEC one of the most recognized educational institutions in Central America also, thanks to its innovative educational model (SENECA, Laspau-Harvard), for its interest in contributing to national extension of society, and leading the development of various projects that have contributed to the development of marginalized populations in Honduras.

This university also provides a choice of higher education to working adults through CEUTEC (Centre for Technological Development), which began operations in 2005.

In that same year UNITEC became a member of Laureate International Universities.

Currently, UNITEC has five different campuses distributed in five major cities in Honduras, three in Tegucigalpa, one in San Pedro Sula and another in La Ceiba. It has over 17,000 university students nationwide.

Academics

Its academic programs are focused on the contribution of professionals in the areas of business and engineering, some of them unique in Honduras offering 20 undergraduate programs and 8 master's programs.

Agreements and relationships

Unitec has established agreements and close relationships with other universities and Institutions worldwide:

 Instituto Tecnológico y de Estudios Superiores de Monterrey (Monterrey Institute of Technology and Higher Learning), Mexico
 Universidad Nacional Autónoma de México (Mexico National Autonomous University), Mexico
Universidad del Valle de México (UVM), Mexico
 Universidad Politécnica de Madrid, (Madrid Politechnical University) Spain
 Escuela de Administración de Negocios para Graduados - ESAN- (School of Graduate Business Administration), Peru
 Centro de Investigación de Tecnología de Alimentos de la Universidad de Costa Rica (CITA-UCR) (National Research Center on Food Service of Costa Rica University), Costa Rica
 Escuela Superior de Economía y Administracion de Empresas (Graduate School of Economy and Business Administration), Argentina
 Universidad de Huelva (Huelva University), Spain
 Calvin College, Michigan, United States
 University of Miami, United States
 Louisiana State University, United States
 Instituto Tecnológico de Buenos Aires (Buenos Aires Institute of Technology), Argentina
 Rochester Institute of Technology, United States
 Universidad Central (Central University), Chile
 Universidad Diego Portales (Diego Portales University), Chile
 Universidad de Fortaleza (Fortaleza University), Brazil
 Universidad Torcuato di Tella (Torcuato di Tella University), Argentina
 Universidad del Salvador (University del Salvador), Argentina
 Universidad de Buenos Aires (Buenos Aires University), Argentina
 Universidad de Santiago de Chile (Santiago de Chile University), Chile
 Universidad Politécnica de Valencia (Valencia Politechnical University), Spain
 Universidad Autónoma de Barcelona (Barcelona Autonomous University), Spain
 Universidad Antonio de Nebrija (Antonio de Nebrija University), Spain
 Universidad Católica del Norte (Catholic University of the North), Chile
 Universidad Mayor (Major University), Chile
 Instituto Nacional de Tecnología Industrial (Industrial Technology National Institute), Argentina
 IAE Universidad Austral, Argentina
 Normandy Business School, France
 Institute of Industrial Engineers, United States
 Tompkins Cortland Community College, United States
 National Tsing Hua University, Taiwan
 Tamkang University, Taiwan
 Universidad de Caxias do Sul (Caxias do Sul University), Brazil
 Fundacao Universidade de Brasil (Foundation of Brazil Universities), Brazil
 Universidad de Cienfuegos Carlos Rafaél Rodríguez, Cuba

Since 2005 UNITEC Honduras is affiliated member of Laureate International Universities, they have a partnership with more than 100 institutions worldwide.

References

External links
Unitec website

Unitec
Educational institutions established in 1987
Tegucigalpa
1987 establishments in Honduras